Ponape may refer to:
Pohnpei, an island in the Federated States of Micronesia
Ponape (barque), a German sailing ship